Kirian Rodríguez Concepción (born 5 March 1996) is a Spanish footballer who plays for UD Las Palmas as a midfielder.

Club career
Rodríguez was born in Candelaria, Santa Cruz de Tenerife, Canary Islands, and joined UD Las Palmas' youth setup in 2014, from CD Ofra. He spent his first senior years playing with the C-team in the regional leagues, before being promoted to the reserves in January 2018, after scoring 13 goals with the C's.

On 14 September 2018, Rodríguez renewed his contract with the club until 2020. He made his first-team debut the following 2 June, coming on as a second-half substitute for fellow youth graduate Fabio González in a 0–0 home draw against UD Almería in the Segunda División.

On 17 June 2019, Rodríguez was one of the five players from the B-side who were definitely promoted to the main squad. He scored his first professional goal on 20 July of the following year, netting the opener in a 5–1 home routing of Extremadura UD.

On 2 August 2022, Kirian announced through a press conference that he was diagnosed with a Hodgkin lymphoma.

References

External links

1996 births
Living people
People from Tenerife
Sportspeople from the Province of Santa Cruz de Tenerife
Spanish footballers
Footballers from the Canary Islands
Association football midfielders
Segunda División players
Segunda División B players
Tercera División players
Divisiones Regionales de Fútbol players
UD Las Palmas C players
UD Las Palmas Atlético players
UD Las Palmas players